The Royal Society Wolfson Research Merit Award was an award made by the Royal Society from 2000 to 2020.

It was administered by the Royal Society and jointly funded by the Wolfson Foundation and the UK Office of Science and Technology, to provide universities "with additional financial support to attract key researchers to this country or to retain those who might seek to gain higher salaries elsewhere." to tackle the brain drain. They were given in four annual rounds, with up to seven awards per round.

In 2020 the scheme was replaced by  the Royal Society Wolfson Fellowship, described by the Royal Society as providing long-term flexible funding for senior career researchers recruited or retained to a UK university or research institution in fields identified as a strategic priority for the host department or organisation.

Recipients
Winners of this award (see Royal Society Wolfson Research Merit Award holders) award included:

 Sue Black
 Samuel L. Braunstein
 Martin Bridson (2012)
 Michael Bronstein (2018)
 Peter Buneman
 Michael Cant (2015)
 José A. Carrillo (2012)
 Ken Carslaw
 Marianna Csörnyei
 Candace Currie (2015)
 Nicholas Dale (2015)
 Roger Davies
 René de Borst
 Nora de Leeuw
 Jonathan Essex
 Ernesto Estrada
 Wenfei Fan
 Andrea C. Ferrari
 Philip A. Gale (2013)
 Matthew Gaunt (2015)
 Alain Goriely (2010)
 Georg Gottlob
 Andrew Granville (2015)
 Peter Green
 Ruth Gregory
 Martin Hairer
 Edwin Hancock
 Mark Handley
 Nicholas Higham
 Simone Hochgreb (2003)
 Saiful Islam (2013)
 Brad Karp
 Tara Keck
 Rebecca Kilner (2015)
 Daniela Kuhn (2015)
 Alistair Pike
 Ari Laptev
 Tim Lenton
 Malcolm Levitt
 Stephan Lewandowsky 
 Leonid Libkin
 Jon Lloyd (microbiologist) (2015)
 Andy Mackenzie
 Barbara Maher (2006 -2012)
 Vladimir Markovic
 Robin May (2015)
 Paul Milewski
 E.J. Milner-Gulland
 Tim Minshull (2015)
 André Neves
 Peter O'Hearn
  William Lionheart  (2015)
 Fabrice Pierron
 Gordon Plotkin
 Adrian Podoleanu (2015)
 David Richardson
 Gareth Roberts (2015)
 Alexander Ruban (2015)
 Daniela Schmidt (2015)
 Steven H. Simon
 Nigel Smart
 John Smillie (2015)
 John Speakman
 David Stephenson (2015)
 Kate Storey (2015)
 Andrew Taylor (2015)
 Françoise Tisseur (2014)
 Richard Thomas
 Vlatko Vedral (2007)
 Benjamin Willcox (2015)
 Richard Winpenny (2009)
 Philip J. Withers (2002)
 Tim Wright (2015)
 Ziheng Yang
 Xin Yao (2012)
 Nikolay I. Zheludev

References

Grants (money)
Research
Funding bodies